Erlandsson is a Swedish surname. Notable people with the surname include:
Adrian Erlandsson (born 1970), prolific Swedish death metal and black metal drummer
Daniel Erlandsson (born 1976), Swedish drummer in the melodic death metal band Arch Enemy
Eskil Erlandsson (born 1957), Swedish politician and member of the Centre Party
Ingemar Erlandsson (born 1957), former Swedish footballer
Martin Erlandsson (born 1974), Swedish professional golfer
Tim Erlandsson (born 1996), Swedish footballer
Viveka Erlandsson, Swedish mathematician

See also
Erlandson
Erlendsson

Swedish-language surnames